Charles Rex may refer to: 

 King Charles (disambiguation), a number of kings' names, and persons' nicknames
 Charles Rex (novel), a 1922 romance novel by Ethel M. Dell

See also

 Charles Rex Berry (1924–2005), U.S. American football player
 
 Carolus Rex (disambiguation), where Carolus is Latin for Charles
 Charles (disambiguation)
 Rex (disambiguation)